The Absence is an American melodic death metal band from Tampa, Florida. Their style has been described as aggressive thrash metal with Scandinavian metal influences. They were previously signed to Metal Blade Records and are now signed to M-Theory Audio.

History 
The band released a self-titled EP in 2004 and followed up with their debut album, From Your Grave, in 2005. The band's second album, Riders of the Plague, was released in 2007. The album was praised in a review for finding an "interesting balance" between the genres death metal and thrash metal. In 2007, bassist Michael Leon joined the band. Drummer Jeramie Kling left the band that same year and was temporarily replaced by Chris Pistillo from the Tampa death metal scene. The band recruited Justin Reynolds as their new drummer in early 2008.

The Absence stated in late 2008 that they would be entering the studio to record a new album in March 2009. Due to time constraints and touring duties, the band said they would enter the studio on September 10 since the original date "wasn't the right time." The band delayed the recording of the album again and later entered Mana Recording Studios on November 2, 2009, to record Enemy Unbound. Their third studio album, Enemy Unbound was released on September 14, 2010, and reached No. 55 on the Billboard Heatseekers chart. Jeramie Kling rejoined the band during summer 2010. On September 27, 2010, The Absence released their music video of "Enemy Unbound" from their eponymous album Enemy Unbound. As of January 1, 2013, guitarist Peter Joseph parted ways with The Absence. On January 22, 2013, it was announced that Per Nilsson of Scar Symmetry had joined the band.

On July 25, 2015, guitarist Patrick Scott Pintavalle announced on Facebook that he had left the band.

On March 30, 2021, the band announced their fifth full-length album, would be titled Coffinized. It was released June 25, 2021.

Band line-up

Current members 
 Jamie Stewart – vocals 
 Jeramie Kling – drums 
 Taylor Nordberg – guitars

Former members 
 Patrick Pintavalle – guitars 
 Nicholas Calaci – bass 
 Christopher Tolan – guitars 
 Justin Grant – drums 
 Peter Joseph – guitars 
 Mike Leon – bass 
 Justin Reynolds – drums 
 Per Nilsson – guitars 
 Joey Concepcion – guitars

Discography

Studio albums 
 From Your Grave (2005)
 Riders of the Plague (2007)
 Enemy Unbound (2010)
 A Gift for the Obsessed (2018)
 Coffinized (2021)

EPs 
 The Absence (2004)

Singles and music videos 
 "From Your Grave" (2005)
 "Dead and Gone" (2008)
 "Enemy Unbound" (2010)
 "Oceans" (2013)
 "Septic Testament" (2016)

References

External links 
 The Absence at Bandcamp
 The Absence at MySpace
 The Absence at Encyclopaedia Metallum

Metal Blade Records artists
Musical groups from Tampa, Florida
Death metal musical groups from Florida
American melodic death metal musical groups
Musical groups established in 2002
Musical quintets
2002 establishments in Florida